Ernests Gulbis was the defending champion, but lost to Jérémy Chardy in the second round.

Gilles Simon won the title, defeating Gaël Monfils in the final, 6–4, 1–6, 7–6(7–4).

Seeds
The top four seeds receive a bye into the second round.

Draw

Finals

Top half

Bottom half

Qualifying

Seeds

 Jürgen Melzer (first round)
 Marsel İlhan (qualifying competition)
 Kenny de Schepper (qualifying competition)
 Nicolas Mahut (qualified)
 Pierre-Hugues Herbert (qualified)
 Norbert Gombos (second round)
 Alexander Zverev (qualified)
 Marius Copil (first round)

Qualifiers

Qualifying draw

First qualifier

Second qualifier

Third qualifier

Fourth qualifier

References
 Main Draw
 Qualifying Draw

Open 13 - Singles
2015 Singles